Tunnel des Tuileries is a tunnel parallel to the Seine at the Quai des Tuileries close to Louvre. Today, the 861m long tunnel is reserved for pedestrians and bicycles. When it opened in 1967, it was used for one-way traffic from west to east as an integral part of Voie Georges-Pompidou.

In July 2022, colorful lights were installed and artists have painted several huge frescos inside the tunnel.

Road tunnels in France
Streets in the 1st arrondissement of Paris